The 2022 IMSA SportsCar Championship (known for sponsorship reasons as the 2022 IMSA WeatherTech SportsCar Championship) was the 52nd racing season sanctioned by the International Motor Sports Association (IMSA), which traces its lineage back to the 1971 IMSA GT Championship. This was also the ninth season of the IMSA SportsCar Championship since the merger between the American Le Mans Series and the Rolex Sports Car Series in 2014, and the seventh under the sponsorship of WeatherTech. The series began on January 27 for the 24 Hours of Daytona, and ended on October 1 with the Petit Le Mans after 12 races.

Classes 
 Daytona Prototype international (DPi)
 Le Mans Prototype 2 (LMP2)
 Le Mans Prototype 3 (LMP3)
 GT Daytona Pro (GTD Pro)
 GT Daytona (GTD)

For the 2022 season, the GT Le Mans (GTLM) class is set to be retired, following dwindling interest in the midst of the withdrawal of the Ford GT program operated by Chip Ganassi Racing, and the Porsche 911 program run by CORE Autosport in 2019 and 2020 respectively. GT Daytona was thus split into a new all-pro class (GTD Pro) as a replacement for the GTLM class, aligning its technical regulations with that of the pre-existing regular GTD class.

After six seasons of leading the class hierarchy in the IMSA SportsCar Championship, the DPi class is set to enter its final season of competition, with the arrival of the converged "Grand Touring Prototype" class confirmed for the 2023 season (Le Mans Hypercar and LMDh). This class is set to bring the flagship class of the IMSA SportsCar Championship to a common ground with the 24 Hours of Le Mans race, something not seen in IMSA competition for over a decade.

Schedule 
The schedule was released on August 6, 2021, and features 12 rounds.

Notes

Entries

Daytona Prototype International (DPi)

Le Mans Prototype 2 (LMP2) 
In accordance with the 2017 LMP2 regulations, all cars in the LMP2 class use the Gibson GK428 V8 engine.

Le Mans Prototype 3 (LMP3) 
In accordance with the 2020 LMP3 regulations, all cars in the LMP3 class use the Nissan VK56DE 5.6L V8 engine.

GT Daytona (GTD Pro / GTD)

Race Results 
Bold indicates overall winner.

Championship standings

Points systems 
Championship points are awarded in each class at the finish of each event. Points are awarded based on finishing positions in qualifying and the race as shown in the chart below.

 Drivers points

Points are awarded in each class at the finish of each event.

 Team points

Team points are calculated in exactly the same way as driver points, using the point distribution chart. Each car entered is considered its own "team" regardless if it is a single entry or part of a two-car team.

 Manufacturer points

There are also a number of manufacturer championships which utilize the same season-long point distribution chart. The manufacturer championships recognized by IMSA are as follows:

 Daytona Prototype international (DPi): Engine & bodywork manufacturer
 GT Daytona Pro (GTDP): Car manufacturer
 GT Daytona (GTD): Car manufacturer

Each manufacturer receives finishing points for its highest finishing car in each class. The positions of subsequent finishing cars from the same manufacturer are not taken into consideration, and all other manufacturers move up in the order.

 Example: Manufacturer A finishes 1st and 2nd at an event, and Manufacturer B finishes 3rd. Manufacturer A receives 35 first-place points while Manufacturer B would earn 32 second-place points.

 Michelin Endurance Cup

The points system for the Michelin Endurance Cup is different from the normal points system. Points are awarded on a 5–4–3–2 basis for drivers, teams and manufacturers. The first finishing position at each interval earns five points, four points for second position, three points for third, with two points awarded for fourth and each subsequent finishing position.

At Rolex 24 at Daytona, points are awarded at 6 hours, 12 hours, 18 hours and at the finish. At the Sebring 12 hours, points are awarded at 4 hours, 8 hours and at the finish. At the Watkins Glen 6 hours, points are awarded at 3 hours and at the finish. At the Petit Le Mans (10 hours), points are awarded at 4 hours, 8 hours and at the finish.

Like the season-long team championship, Michelin Endurance Cup team points are awarded for each car and drivers get points in any car that they drive, in which they are entered for points. The manufacturer points go to the highest placed car from that manufacturer (the others from that manufacturer not being counted), just like the season-long manufacturer championship.

For example: in any particular segment manufacturer A finishes 1st and 2nd and manufacturer B finishes 3rd. Manufacturer A only receives first-place points for that segment. Manufacturer B receives the second-place points.

Drivers' Championships

Standings: Daytona Prototype International (DPi)

Standings: Le Mans Prototype 2 (LMP2) 

†: Post-event penalty. Car moved to back of class.

‡: Points count towards Michelin Endurance Cup championship only

Standings: Le Mans Prototype 3 (LMP3) 

†: Post-event penalty. Car moved to back of class.

‡: Points count towards Michelin Endurance Cup championship only

Standings: GT Daytona Pro (GTD Pro) 

†: Post-event penalty. Car moved to back of class.

Standings: Grand Touring Daytona (GTD)  

†: Post-event penalty. Car moved to back of class.

‡: Points count towards WeatherTech Sprint Cup championship only.

Teams' Championships

Standings: Daytona Prototype International (DPi) 

†: Post-event penalty. Car moved to back of class.

Standings: Le Mans Prototype 2 (LMP2) 

†: Post-event penalty. Car moved to back of class.

‡: Points only awarded towards Michelin Endurance Cup championship

Standings: Le Mans Prototype 3 (LMP3) 

†: Post-event penalty. Car moved to back of class.

‡: Points count towards Michelin Endurance Cup championship only

Standings: GT Daytona Pro (GTD Pro) 

†: Post-event penalty. Car moved to back of class.

Standings: Grand Touring Daytona (GTD)  

†: Post-event penalty. Car moved to back of class.

‡: Points count towards WeatherTech Sprint Cup championship only.

Manufacturers' Championships

Standings: Daytona Prototype International (DPi)

Standings: GT Daytona Pro (GTD Pro)

Standings: Grand Touring Daytona (GTD)

Notes

References

External links 

WeatherTech SportsCar Championship seasons
IMSA SportsCar Championship
IMSA SportsCar Championship
2022 WeatherTech SportsCar Championship season